Ippolito Andreasi (1548 – 5 June 1608) was an Italian painter of the Renaissance period. He was a pupil of Giulio Romano in his hometown of Mantua. He collaborated with Teodoro Ghisi in painting the ceiling and cupola of the Cathedral.

References

 Getty ULAN entry.

1548 births
1608 deaths
16th-century Italian painters
Italian male painters
17th-century Italian painters
Painters from Mantua
Italian Mannerist painters